Pizzey Park is an open-air sports and recreation precinct in Miami, a suburb in the Gold Coast, Queensland, Australia. The  site is owned and operated by the Gold Coast City Council.

History 
The Pizzey Park sporting complex was established on a  site in 1969. It was named after the former Queensland Premier Jack Pizzey. It was previously a garbage dump.

The Australian Institute of Sport established their training facilities for canoe/kayak at Pizzey Park in June 1991 at a cost of $500,000. The park was expanded to accommodate this additional facility, extending westward into the neighbouring suburb of Mermaid Waters.

Facilities
Pizzey Park has sports fields for a wide variety of sports including: rugby league, rugby union, Australian Rules Football, soccer, netball, softball and athletics.

Skateboard and BMX facilities are available. The site also provides a network of tracks for walking, jogging and cycling, around a number of lakes as well as an off-leash dog park.

The site includes the Miami Aquatic Centre featuring two outdoor heated  swimming pools and one indoor  teaching pool.

See also

 Sports on the Gold Coast, Queensland
 Sport in Queensland

References

Rugby league stadiums in Australia
Soccer venues in Queensland
Rugby union stadiums in Australia
Netball venues in Queensland
Cricket grounds in Australia
Skateparks in Australia
Sports venues on the Gold Coast, Queensland
Burleigh Bears
Softball venues in Australia